Speocirolana thermydronis is a species of crustacean in the family Cirolanidae. It is endemic to Mexico and only known from springs near Cuatro Ciénegas, Coahuila. Its habitat is threatened by irrigation.

References

Cymothoida
Freshwater crustaceans of North America
Endemic crustaceans of Mexico
Taxa named by Wendell L. Minckley
Crustaceans described in 1966
Taxonomy articles created by Polbot
Taxobox binomials not recognized by IUCN